is a railway station on the Hokuriku Main Line in the city of Nonoichi, Ishikawa, Japan, operated by West Japan Railway Company (JR West).

Lines

Station layout
The station consists of two opposed side platforms connected by a footbridge. The station is attended.

Platforms

History
Nonoichi Station opened on 25 March 1968. With the privatization of Japanese National Railways (JNR) on 1 April 1987, the station came under the control of JR West.

Passenger statistics
In fiscal 2015, the station was used by an average of 1,758 passengers daily (boarding passengers only).

Surrounding area
Okyōzuka Site

See also
 List of railway stations in Japan

References

External links

  

Stations of West Japan Railway Company
Railway stations in Ishikawa Prefecture
Railway stations in Japan opened in 1968
Hokuriku Main Line
Nonoichi, Ishikawa